Rocket Racer is the name of two fictional characters appearing in American comic books published by Marvel Comics.

Publication history
The first version appeared in Amazing Spider-Man #172 (Sept 1977) as a super-villain. He returned in Amazing Spider-Man #182-183 in a battle against the Big Wheel, and his origin was finally revealed in Spectacular Spider-Man #104. Rocket Racer appeared as a supporting character in Avengers Academy #21 & 26 (Jan & April 2012).

The second version first appeared in Amazing Spider-Man (vol. 2) #13 (January 2000).

Fictional character biography

Robert Farrell
Robert Farrell, born in Brooklyn, New York, was the eldest of seven children. He became responsible for his younger siblings when his mother Emma Johnson Farrell became ill. Robert was a scientific prodigy, and when he realized he could not earn enough to support his family, he turned to a life of crime as the Rocket Racer. He developed a super-powered skateboard which is propelled at great speed by small rockets and cybernetically controlled by a crude walkman-like device. He wore a weapon-equipped costume, including rocket-powered gloves which give him the ability to hit an opponent with a "rocket-powered-punch."

Early in his career as a burglar, Rocket Racer encounters Spider-Man.

Rocket Racer hires the Tinkerer to redesign his skateboard after his first defeat by Spider-Man. At one point, he is hired by Jackson Weele to steal evidence that might be incriminating. Robert uses the evidence to blackmail Weele who wishes to commit suicide but Robert stops this. Even then, though, he mocks Weele as Big Weele. This is enough for Jackson to hire the Tinkerer to create a literal Big Wheel, to chase Robert around town with. Spider-Man assists and Weele seemingly falls to death in the Hudson River. Later, Rocket Racer was saved by Spider-Man from the Bounty Hunter.

Repeated defeats at the hands of Spider-Man and several brushes with the law, including a short jail sentence, convince Robert to reform. He goes through a high school equivalency course and his extremely high marks gain him a scholarship to Empire State University. This does not go well as his first few days are full with combating the efforts of a hate-group on campus. Though assisted by Spider-Man and sometimes, by other students who oppose the racism, Robert still struggles with his own rage during the entire ordeal.

Later, Robert attempted to prove Spider-Man innocent of a crime; and first encountered Silver Sable and The Outlaws. He joined forces with Spider-Man to stop the white supremacist, Skinhead. He was hired as a freelance operative for Silver Sable International to prevent two youths from stealing the victims' weapons at the Bar with No Name, the site of the Scourge massacre. He was again hired by Sable to stop the Speed Demon. He joined Spider-Man and the Outlaws against the Avengers and the Space Phantom. He was again hired along with the Outlaws to retrieve a Symkarian nuclear device in England. He was hired by Sable to stop a runaway subway maintenance robot. Rocket Racer finally formally joined the Outlaws, to rescue the kidnapped daughter of a Canadian official.

Rocket Racer briefly joined Tombstone's prison squad along with Big Ben and Hypno-Hustler where they provided Tombstone some protection at the time when he went under a heart bypass.

Robert is identified as one of the 142 registered superheroes who appear on the cover of Avengers: The Initiative #1. As a registered hero, he reported to Camp Hammond for training. Despite this, he needed money to support his comatose mother and prevent repossession of their house, so he was seen working for MODOK. He appeared to have been tempted back into crime, and reduced to a state of stuttering nervousness by the situation. He turned out to have been working for S.H.I.E.L.D. all along, with a deal that they will give him the money he needs in return for the Hypernova, yet he failed and it is unknown what happened to his mother.

Rocket Racer is part of the new class of students when the Avengers Academy moves to the West Coast Avengers' former headquarters. Rocket Racer later leaves the Avengers Academy alongside Machine Teen to join child genius Jeremy Briggs.

Henry Sleeman
Henry Sleeman was hired by an unnamed employer to befriend Robert Farrell and steal the Rocket Racer gear. He did so, taking the name "Troy" and posing as Farrell's friend for months.  When Farrell finally showed him where the gear was kept, "Troy" tied Farrell up and stole it, pursuing Spider-Man with the intention of fighting, only to be defeated when restaurateur Harry Sloane opened a door at just the right time for 'Troy' to run into the door and knock himself unconscious.

Powers and abilities
Robert Farrell has a gifted intellect, but no superhuman powers. He wears gauntlets furnished with explosive mini-rockets, and utilizes a cybernetically-controlled, rocket-powered magnetic skateboard, which he designed and was later redesigned by Tinkerer.

Reception
 In 2022, CBR.com ranked Rocket Racer 3rd in their "Spider-Man's 10 Funniest Villains" list.
 In 2022, Screen Rant included Rocket Racer in their "10 Best Marvel Characters Who Made Their Debut In Spider-Man Comics" list.

Other versions
Outside of mainstream Marvel continuity, Rocket Racer has appeared as a super-villain in Spider-Man Loves Mary Jane. In another series Rocket Racer is a socially withdrawn patsy of the supervillain called 'The Tinkerer', and his rocket gear is simply used to showcase the man's technological genius to potential clients.

In other media
The Robert Farrell incarnation of Rocket Racer appeared in a self-titled episode of Spider-Man, voiced by Billy Atmore. This version is a teenager living in a crime-ridden neighborhood who is in constant trouble with the police and lives with a single mother whose store is constantly harassed by criminals demanding protection money. Despite this, Farrell works at the Science Center and studies under Peter Parker to develop his skill in gyro mechanisms. Using these and stolen technology from Jackson Weele, Farrell creates a cybernetically controlled, rocket-powered, magnetic skateboard to help his mother as the Rocket Racer. After being framed for a crime he did not commit however, Farrell is pursued by Spider-Man before they are both attacked by Weele. Spider-Man and Farrell join forces to defeat Weele, and  Farrell vows to use his scientific skills to help his mother instead.

References

External links
 Rocket Racer at Marvel.com
 Rocket Racer's Profile at Spiderfan.org
 

Characters created by Len Wein
Characters created by Ross Andru
Comics characters introduced in 1977
Fictional African-American people
Fictional characters from New York City
Fictional engineers
Fictional inventors
Fictional skateboarders
Marvel Comics male superheroes
Marvel Comics male supervillains
Marvel Comics scientists
Marvel Comics sidekicks
Marvel Comics superheroes
Marvel Comics supervillains
Spider-Man characters
Vigilante characters in comics